Angry Birds Blues is a Finnish computer-animated television series starring the Blues (Jay, Jake, and Jim) and the Hatchlings that appeared in The Angry Birds Movie. Animated in the same style as the film, it was produced by Rovio Entertainment along with its affiliated company Kaiken Entertainment, with Bardel Entertainment providing its animation. The series premiered on 10 March 2017 on the Toons.TV channel, before continuing on the Angry Birds' official YouTube channel after Toons.TV was shut down.

Characters
 The Blues are the three triplets Jake, Jay, and Jim.  They are mischievous and smart, and either succeed or hilariously fail on their plans but no matter what happens, they carry on. To distinguish the three in this series (and also earlier in The Angry Birds Movie), each triplet has different eye coloration: Jay has blue irises, Jake has teal irises, and Jim has brown irises. Jay is the confident, know-it-all oldest brother and the leader of the Blues, Jake is the laid-back middle-hatched brother and a mischief-schemer, and Jim is the kind-hearted, but a shy and wacky little brother. The Blues are voiced by Heljä Heikkinen, Vilppu Uusitalo and Vertti Uusitalo in this series. Jay is the leader of the blues and is voiced by JoJo Siwa in The Angry Birds Movie 2.
 Zoe is a pink hatchling which is very curious, especially when it comes to the Blues' interesting plans. She thinks that everything is fun. She was voiced by Brooklynn Prince in The Angry Birds Movie 2.
 Will is a purple hatchling who mostly helps the other Hatchlings if they are doing something.
 Vincent is a green hatchling who always interacts with his surroundings.
 Arianna is an orange hatchling who made her first appearance in "Flight Club".
 Samantha is a light yellow (or white)hatchling that made her first appearance in The Cutest Weapon. She had also starred in a short called "The Early Hatchling Gets the Worm" in which she forms an unlikely friendship with a worm that she adopts.  She also met Red while crossing the village's main street, blowing a raspberry at him in the film.
 Olive Blue is the mother of the Blues who appeared in The Angry Birds Movie, and made her Angry Birds Blues debut in "The Cutest Weapon". In this series, Olive is voiced by Heljä Heikkinen, but in the film she is voiced by Danielle Brooks.
 Greg Blue is the father of the Blues who appeared in The Angry Birds Movie, and made his Angry Birds Blues debut in "Knights of the BBQ". In this series, Greg is voiced by Antti Pääkkönen, but in the film he is voiced by Kevin Bigley.

Episodes

Video game
In August 2017, Rovio released a mobile game involving the characters of Angry Birds Blues, titled Angry Birds Match, as part of the Angry Birds series.  Available on iOS and Android, the game is a match-3 puzzle game, where players solve puzzles to accomplish missions on behalf of the Hatchlings, such as defeating pigs, retrieving stolen toys, and collecting food. Players can also watch the Hatchlings play around freely in various environments in between levels, unlock new outfits for them to wear and also call upon Red, Chuck, and Bomb, the three major lead characters of the series, to assist them in a level if certain conditions are fulfilled. The game is free-to-play with in-app purchases.

References

External links

Angry Birds television series
2010s Finnish television series
2017 Finnish television series debuts
2017 Finnish television series endings
Finnish children's animated comedy television series
Computer-animated television series
Television series by Rovio Entertainment
Animated television series spinoffs
Animated television series about birds
Animated television series without speech